The Programming Research Group (PRG) was part of the Oxford University Computing Laboratory (OUCL) in Oxford, England, along with the Numerical Analysis Group, until OUCL became the Department of Computer Science in 2011.

The PRG was founded by Christopher Strachey (1916–1975)  in 1965. It was originally located at 45 Banbury Road.

After Strachey's untimely death, C.A.R. Hoare, FRS took over the leadership in 1977. The PRG ethos is summed up by the following quotation from Strachey, found and promulgated by Tony Hoare after he arrived at the PRG:

The PRG moved to 8–11 Keble Road in 1984. During the later 1980s and early 1990s, some members of the PRG were housed at 2 South Parks Road, including Joseph Goguen (who was at the PRG during 1988–1996). Tony Hoare retired in 1999 and the PRG was led by Samson Abramsky from 2000. The PRG continued until the renaming of the Oxford University Computing Laboratory to the Department of Computer Science on 1 June 2011, under the leadership of Bill Roscoe, a former member of the PRG.

The PRG was a centre of excellence in the field of formal methods, playing a leading role in the development of the Z notation (initiated by a visit of Jean-Raymond Abrial) and CSP (together with the associated Occam programming language). It won Queen's Awards with IBM and Inmos for work in this area.

References

External links
 PRG website (Archive.org, 2010)

Educational institutions established in 1965
1965 establishments in England
2011 disestablishments in England
Educational institutions disestablished in 2011
Departments of the University of Oxford
Formal methods organizations
Computer science institutes in the United Kingdom
Oxford University Computing Laboratory